The singles discography of Eric Clapton consists of 24 early career singles that Clapton recorded with various groups and singers including The Yardbirds, John Mayall & the Blues Breakers, Cream, John Lennon and the Plastic Ono Band as well as Derek and the Dominos. As a solo performer, Clapton released 91 singles and various promotional formats from 1970 to date. His most commercially successful singles are "Lay Down Sally", "Wonderful Tonight", "Change the World", "Tears in Heaven" and Bob Marley's "I Shot the Sheriff", released in 1974, charting substantially better than Marley's own earlier release had, becoming a Billboard Hot 100 number-one hit.

Clapton's best-selling single is "Wonderful Tonight" which has sold more than four million copies worldwide, although he is most known for his rock song "Layla", which was originally released in 1971. Clapton later rerecorded the song acoustically for his 1992 "Unplugged" million-seller, which helped to cement Clapton's reputation as both a guitarist and singer. The British rock musician also collaborated with friends along his extensive solo career. Featured singles with artists like George Harrison, Elton John, Sting, Cher, Chrissie Hynde, Neneh Cherry and Zucchero Fornaciari helped to uplift Clapton's single performances.

Early career (1960s – early 1970s) singles

Solo career singles

1970s

1980s

1990s

2000s

2010s

Featured singles

Promotional singles

See also
Eric Clapton videography

Notes

References

External links

Discography
Rock music discographies
Blues discographies
Discographies of British artists